Elverum is a Norwegian surname. Notable people with the surname include:

Kim Rene Elverum Sorsell (born 1988), Norwegian ski jumper
Phil Elverum (born 1978), American songwriter, producer, and visual artist

Norwegian-language surnames